Marina Pezerović (born 16 December 2002), better known by her stage name Zera, is a Serbian-Austrian singer and songwriter.

Early life 
Pezerović was born on 16 December 2002, in Vorarlberg, Austria, to Serb parents from Novi Sad. They moved to Austria at the end of the previous century, where they still live and work today. She has had a love for music since she was young, and she started playing music and playing the piano and guitar from elementary school. She graduated from the music school in Dornbirn and often performed at festivals there as a lead artist before some concerts.<ref name="want" Among other things, Pezerović also performed on Lake Constance, where she performed in front of about eight thousand people as an opening group. At first, she sang exclusively in English, and then she started posting covers of Serbian musicians on her social networks.<ref name=":1"
Zera seys at her intervew that her favorite fan is Emilija Buha knowed as Emićka

Career
Pezerović started her career after she published a cover of Rasta's song "Ragga Session" on her Instagram. In captured attention of Rasta and he shared a video of her singing, which attracted the attention of the Serbian public and Serbian musicians, including Milica Pavlović, with whom she even spoke on the phone, and Pavlović gave her support and advised her that she should be a songwriter for others and to realize herself in that area as well.<ref name="want" In addition, Marko Panić Maleni, a member of the production company Generacija Zed and brother of Serbian rapper Nucci, contacted Zera after Rasta had shared the cover. Pezerović traveled to Serbia in June 2020 to met the people from the company.

She rose to prominence after publishing her self-written debut single "Do zore" (Until the Dawn), which contains lyrics in German. The song reached the third place in Serbian trending on YouTube, and was also on the charts in Austria and Germany. Thanks to the success of the single, Zera continued to collaborate with Generacija Zed and after a few months, on 7 May 2021, she released her sophomore single "Da li si?" (Have You?). After less than five days, it has already taken the first position in trending in Serbia.

Discography

Singles

Other charted songs

References

External links
 

2002 births
Living people
People from Vorarlberg
Austrian people of Serbian descent
21st-century Serbian women singers
Serbian pop singers
Serbian rappers
21st-century Austrian women singers
Austrian pop singers
Austrian rappers